Kritsa Gorge (Greek Φαράγγι Κριτσάς [fa'ragi kri'tsas]) is a narrow gorge not far from the town of Kritsa, in Crete, Greece, west of Agios Nikolaos.

Landforms of Lasithi
Gorges of Crete